Count Yourself In is the debut album by the pop punk band Ten Second Epic. It was released October 10, 2006. There were music videos released for "Suck It Up, Princess", "Count Yourself In", and "Old Habits Die Hard" and they have received notable airplay on Much Music.  The "Old Habits Die Hard" video even made the MuchMusic Countdown, debuting on June 29, 2007. The songs "Suck It Up Princess" and "Boys Will Be Boys" were later released on The Virtual EP in 2008 as redux versions.

Track listing

References 

2006 albums
Ten Second Epic albums
Albums produced by Garth Richardson